Rumex scutatus (syn. Rumex alpestris) is a plant in the buckwheat family, used as a culinary herb. Its common names include French sorrel, buckler sorrel, shield-leaf sorrel, and sometimes the culinary name "green-sauce".

As a culinary herb, it is used in salads, soups, and sauces (especially for fish). French sorrel tastes tart from its oxalic acid content, with a hint of lemon.  Later in the season, it can be bitter.

French sorrel is hardy in most regions, tolerating frost, full sun and short dry spells. It is sometimes preferred for culinary uses to Rumex acetosa, garden sorrel.

References

External links

scutatus
Herbs
Flora of Europe
Flora of Western Asia
Plants described in 1753
Taxa named by Carl Linnaeus